Strained yogurt, Greek yogurt, yogurt cheese, sack yogurt, or kerned yogurt is yogurt that has been strained to remove most of its whey, resulting in a thicker consistency than normal unstrained yogurt, while still preserving the distinctive sour taste of yogurt. Like many types, strained yogurt is often made from milk enriched by boiling off some water content, or by adding extra butterfat and powdered milk. In Europe and North America, it is often made from low-fat or fat-free cow's milk. In Iceland, a similar product named skyr is made.

Strained yogurt is generally marketed in North America as "Greek yogurt" and in the UK as "Greek-style yogurt", though strained yogurt is also widely eaten in Levantine, Eastern Mediterranean, Middle Eastern, Central Asian, South Asian, and Eastern European cuisines, where it is often used in cooking, as it curdles less readily when cooked. It is used in a variety of dishes, cooked or raw, savory or sweet. Straining makes even nonfat varieties thicker, richer, and creamier than unstrained. Since straining removes the whey, more milk is required to make strained yogurt, increasing the production cost. Thickeners such as pectin, locust bean gum, starches or guar gum may also be used to thicken yogurts. In western Europe and the US, strained yogurt has increased in popularity compared to unstrained yogurt. Since the straining process removes some of the lactose, strained yogurt is lower in sugar than unstrained yogurt.

It was reported in 2012 that most of the growth in the $4.1 billion American yogurt industry came from the strained yogurt sub-segment, typically marketed as "Greek yogurt". In the US, there is no legal or standard definition of Greek yogurt, and yogurt thickened with thickening agents may also be sold as "Greek yogurt".

Name

In its places of origin, strained yogurt has two kinds of names: those which explicitly mention how it is made, meaning literally "strained" from Turkish Language or "hung" or "bag" yogurt; and those with a special name.

In English, strained yogurt only became well known outside of immigrant communities in the 1980s, when it was imported into the United Kingdom by the Greek company Fage, under the brand name "Total". Starting in the 1980s, essentially all yogurt in the UK called "Greek yogurt" was strained yogurt made in Greece. Since then, "Greek yogurt" has meant "strained yogurt" in English.

Geographical variations

Central Asia
In the cuisines of many Iranian and Turkic people (e.g. in Afghan, Tatar, Tajik, Uzbek, and other Central Asian cuisines), a type of strained yogurt called chak(k)a
or suzma is consumed. It is obtained by draining qatiq, a local yogurt variety. By further drying it, one obtains qurut, a kind of dry fresh cheese.

West Asia and East Mediterranean
Strained yogurt is known as labneh (labna, labni, lebni, or labani;) in the Levant, Egypt, and the Arabian Peninsula. Besides being used fresh, labneh is also dried then formed into balls, sometimes covered with herbs or spices, and stored under olive oil. Labneh is a popular mezze dish and sandwich ingredient. A common sandwich in the Middle East is one of labneh, mint, thyme, and olive on pita bread. The flavor depends largely on the sort of milk used: labneh from cow's milk has a rather mild flavor. Also the quality of olive oil topping influences the taste of labneh. Milk from camels and other animals is used in labneh production in Saudi Arabia and other Gulf countries.

Labneh is made by straining the liquid out of yogurt until it takes on a consistency similar to a soft cheese. It tastes like tart sour cream or heavy strained yogurt and is a common breakfast dip. It is usually eaten in a fashion similar to hummus, spread on a plate and drizzled with olive oil and often, dried mint. It is also often paired as a dip with the mixed herb blend za'atar.

Bedouin also produce a dry, hard labneh (labaneh malboudeh, similar to Central Asian qurut) that can be stored. Strained labneh is pressed in cheese cloth between two heavy stones and later sun dried. This dry labneh is often eaten with khubz (Arabic bread), in which both khubz and labneh are mixed with water, animal fat, and salt, and rolled into balls.

Labneh is the main ingredient in jameed, which is in turn used in mansaf, the national dish of Jordan.

Labaneh bil zayit, "labaneh in oil", consists of small balls of dry labneh kept under oil, where it can be preserved for over a year. As it ages it turns more sour.

In Egypt, it is eaten with savory accompaniments such as olives and oil, and also with a sweetener such as honey, as a snack or breakfast food. Areesh cheese (or arish) is a type of cheese that originated in Egypt. Shanklish, a fermented cheese, is made from areesh cheese. Arish cheese is made from yogurt heated slowly until it curdles and separates, then placed in cheesecloth to drain. It is similar in taste to ricotta. 
The protein content of Areesh cheese is 17.6%.

As in Greece, strained yogurt is widely used in Cypriot cuisine both as an ingredient in recipes as well as on its own or as a supplement to a dish. In Cyprus, strained yogurt is usually made from sheep's milk.

Strained yogurt in Iran is called mâst chekide and is usually used for making dips, or served as a side dish. 
In Northern Iran, mâst chekide is a variety of kefir with a distinct sour taste. It is usually mixed with fresh herbs in a pesto-like purée called delal.
Yogurt is a side dish to many Iranian meals. Strained yogurt is used as dips and various appetizers with multitudes of ingredients: cucumbers, onions, shallots, fresh herbs (dill, spearmint, parsley, cilantro), spinach, walnuts, zereshk, garlic, etc. The most popular appetizers are spinach or eggplant borani, ‘'Mâst-o-Khiâr'’ with cucumber, spring onions and herbs, or ‘'Mâst-Musir'’ with wild shallots.
Strained yogurt in Balochistan is called sheelanch and is used for making dips served with dates, or served as a side dish.

In Turkey, strained yogurt is known as süzme yoğurt ("strained yogurt") or kese yoğurdu ("bag yogurt"). Water is sometimes added to it in the preparation of cacık, when this is not eaten as a meze but consumed as a beverage. Strained yogurt is used in Turkish mezzes and dips such as haydari.

In Turkish markets, labne is also a popular dairy product but it is different from strained yogurt; it is yogurt-based creamy cheese without salt, and is used like mascarpone.

In Armenia, strained yogurt is called kamats matzoon. Traditionally, it was produced for long-term preservation by draining matzoon in cloth sacks.

Indian subcontinent

In the Indian subcontinent, regular unstrained yogurt (curd), made from cow or water buffalo milk, is often sold in disposable clay bowls called kulhar. Kept for a couple of hours in its clay pot, some of the water evaporates through the unglazed clay's pores. It also cools the curd due to evaporation.

But true strained yogurt, chakka, is made by draining the yogurt in a (preferably muslin) cloth. Shrikhand is a dish made with chakka, sugar, saffron, cardamom, pureed or diced fruit and nuts mixed in; it is often eaten with poori. It is particularly popular in the states of Gujarat and Maharashtra, where dairy producers market shrikhand in containers.

Chakka is also eaten in Pashtun-dominated regions of Pakistan with rice and meat dishes.

South-Eastern Europe

Strained yogurt is used in Greek food mostly as the base for tzatziki dip and as a dessert, with honey, sour cherry syrup, or spoon sweets often served on top. A few savory Greek dishes also use strained yogurt. In Greece, strained yogurt, like yogurt in general, is traditionally made from sheep milk. Fage International S.A. began straining cow milk yogurt for industrial production in Greece in 1975, which is when it launched its brand "Total".

In Albania, strained yogurt is called "salcë kosi" (yogurt sauce). Yogurt is drained in a cloth sack from few hours to overnight. The water released from this process is called "hirrë" and can be used to preserve cheese or as a drink.  The strained yogurt itself is used in dishes in Albanian cuisine and is eaten either plain or with added elements such as dill, garlic, cucumber, nuts or olive oil.

In Bulgaria, where yogurt is considered to be an integral part of the national cuisine, strained yogurt is called "tsedeno kiselo mlyako", and is used in a variety of salads and dressings. Another similar product is "katak" , which is often made from sheep or goat milk.

A variety of strained yogurt called "basa" is a traditional variety of cheese from the region of Lika in Croatia. In Serbia and North Macedonia, it is also known as kiselo mleko (кисело млеко). In southern Serbia, fermented with peppers, it is known as vurda.

Northern Europe
A type of strained yogurt named ymer is available in Denmark. In contrast to the Greek and Turkish variety, only a minor amount of whey is drained off in the production process. Ymer is traditionally consumed with the addition of ymerdrys (lit.: ymer-sprinkle), a mixture of roasted bread crumbs of rugbrød rye bread mixed with brown sugar. Like other types of soured dairy products, ymer is often consumed at breakfast. Strained yogurt topped with muesli and maple syrup is often served at brunch in cafés in Denmark.

Strained yogurt is known as hangop, literally meaning 'hang up' in the Netherlands. It is a traditional dessert. Hangop may also be made using buttermilk.

United Kingdom
In March 2020, it was reported that strained yogurt makes up 28% of the value of the "natural yogurt" category in the UK. In the UK, strained yogurt can only be marketed as "Greek" if made in Greece. Strained cow-milk yogurt not made in Greece is typically sold as "Greek style" or "Greek recipe" for marketing reasons, typically at lower prices than yogurt made in Greece. Among "Greek style" yogurts, there is no distinction between those thickened by straining and those thickened through additives.

In September 2012, Chobani UK began to sell yogurt made in the United States as "Greek yogurt". FAGE, a company that manufactures yogurt in Greece and sells it in the UK, filed a passing-off claim against Chobani in the UK High Court, claiming that UK consumers understood "Greek" to refer to the country of origin (similar to "Belgian beer"); Chobani's position was that consumers understood "Greek" to refer to a preparation (similar to "French toast"). Both companies relied on surveys to prove their point; FAGE also relied on the previous industry practice of UK yogurt makers not to label their yogurt as "Greek yogurt".  Ultimately Mr Justice Briggs found in favor of FAGE and granted an injunction preventing Chobani from using the name "Greek yogurt". In February 2014, this decision was upheld on appeal. Greece may now seek to protect the marketing term, "Greek yogurt", across the entire EU under protected designation of origin rules.

In May 2020, British dairy company Yeo Valley entered the market with an organic product called "Super Thick Kerned Yogurt. The "kerned yogurt" label was the first of its kind, coined in reference to an archaic Somerset term meaning "thickened", which is predominantly used in relation to dairy products.

A product called "Lindahls Kvarg" was launched by Nestlé in 2018, and described as "Sweden’s No. 1 Quark". Quark is a type of high-protein strained curd cheese widely used in Swedish cooking. The company Bio-tiful launched its kefir-quark blend, containing live cultures and protein.

Since 2015, Arla has sold its own skyr product marketed as "Icelandic style yogurt".

North America
In Mexico, the thick yogurt jocoque seco was popularized by local producers of Lebanese origin and is widely available.

Strained yogurt typically marketed as "Greek yogurt" has become popular in the United States and Canada, where it is often used as a lower-calorie substitute for sour cream or crème fraîche. Celebrity chef Graham Kerr became an early adopter of strained yogurt as an ingredient, frequently featuring it (and demonstrating how to strain plain yogurt through a coffee filter) on his eponymous 1990 cooking show, as frequently as he had featured clarified butter on The Galloping Gourmet in the late 1960s. In 2015, food market research firm Packaged Facts reported that Greek yogurt has a 50 percent share of the yogurt market in the United States.

There are numerous "Greek yogurt" brands in North America. FAGE began importing its Greek products in 1998 and opened a domestic production plant in Johnstown, New York, in 2008. Chobani, based in New Berlin, New York, began marketing its Greek-style yogurt in 2007. The Voskos brand entered the US market in 2009 with imported Greek yogurt products at 10%, 2%, and 0% milkfat. Stonyfield Farms, owned by Groupe Danone, introduced Oikos Organic Greek Yogurt in 2007; Danone began marketing a non-organic Dannon Oikos Greek Yogurt in 2011 and also produced a now discontinued blended Greek-style yogurt under the Activia Selects brand; Dannon Light & Fit Greek nonfat yogurt was introduced in 2012, and Activia Greek yogurt was re-introduced in 2013. General Mills introduced a Greek-style yogurt under the Yoplait brand name in early 2010, which was discontinued and replaced by Yoplait Greek 100 in August 2012. Activia Greek yogurt was re-introduced in 2013, and in July 2012 took over US distribution and sales of Canadian Liberté's Greek brands. In Canada, Yoplait was launched in January 2013, and is packaged with toppings.

Production
The characteristic thick texture and high protein content are achieved through either or both of two processing steps. The milk may be concentrated by ultrafiltration to remove a portion of the water before addition of yogurt cultures. Alternatively, after culturing, the yogurt may be centrifuged or membrane-filtered to remove whey, in a process analogous to the traditional straining step. Brands described as "strained" yogurt, including Activia Greek, Chobani, Dannon Light & Fit Greek, Dannon Oikos, FAGE, Stonyfield Organic Oikos, Trader Joe's, and Yoplait have undergone the second process. Process details are highly guarded trade secrets. Other brands of Greek-style yogurt, including Yoplait and some store brands, are made by adding milk protein concentrate and thickeners to standard yogurt to boost the protein content and modify the texture.

The liquid resulting from straining yogurt is called "acid whey" and is composed of water, yogurt cultures, protein, a slight amount of lactose, and lactic acid. It is costly to dispose of. Farmers have used the whey to mix with animal feed and fertilizer. Using anaerobic digesters, it can be a source of methane that can be used to produce electricity.

Nutrition 

Strained yogurt is a good source of protein, calcium, iodine, and vitamin B12. Strained yogurt includes additional steps compared to conventional yogurt, where fermented milk is strained after coagulation to remove liquid whey and lactose, yielding higher protein content. Strained yogurt is required to have at least 5.6% protein content, relative to the 2.7% for unstrained yogurt. Strained yogurt has less sugar content than other yogurts.

Vitamins 
Yogurt is a rich source of dietary minerals, with calcium, magnesium, potassium, phosphorus, and zinc higher in content than in milk. One negative aspect of strained yogurt is that there is greater vitamin loss through the straining process than typical yogurt; in particular, the water-soluble vitamins: vitamin C, thiamin, riboflavin, niacin, pantothenic acid, biotin, folic acid, and vitamin B12 as well as vitamin A in its beta-carotene form can be lost through the straining of liquid whey from yogurt.

Macronutrients
There are no standard regulations in the market to monitor or control the composition of concentrated yogurts. Carbohydrate, fat and protein contents in strained yogurts varied from 1–12, 0–20, and 3.3–11 grams per 100 grams, respectively. Concentrated yogurts contain higher final total solid content than regular yogurts, possibly prolonging shelf life compared to regular yogurts.

See also

 Yogurt
 List of dairy products

References

External links
 Strained yogurt recipes from Greece
 All detail about Greek Yogurt
 Is Greek Yogurt good for you?

Arab cuisine
Yogurts
Central Asian cuisine
Middle Eastern cuisine
Balkan cuisine
South Asian cuisine
Fermented dairy products
Jewish cuisine
Russian cuisine